Shahr-e Somam (also Romanized as Shahr-e Somām and Shahr-i-Samān; also known as Shahr-e Sām) is a village in Kojid Rural District, Rankuh District, Amlash County, Gilan Province, Iran. At the 2006 census, its population was 26, in 8 families.

References 

Populated places in Amlash County